My Bodyguard is a 1980 American family comedy drama film directed by Tony Bill (his directorial debut), and written by Alan Ormsby. The film stars Chris Makepeace, Adam Baldwin (in his first film role), Matt Dillon, Martin Mull, and Ruth Gordon.

The film was the debut of both Baldwin and an uncredited Jennifer Beals and was Joan Cusack's first major film.

Plot
Clifford Peache lives in an upscale Chicago luxury hotel with his father, the hotel manager, and his grandmother. He is a new student at Lake View High School, where he arrives each day in a hotel limousine.

Clifford quickly becomes a target of abuse from a gang of bullies, led by Melvin Moody. They regularly extort money from students, allegedly to protect them from another student, Ricky Linderman. According to school legend, Linderman has killed several people, including his own little brother. Not believing the stories, Clifford consults a teacher who claims that the only violence she's aware of from Ricky's past occurred when his nine-year-old brother died accidentally while playing alone with a gun. Ricky was the first to find the body.

Despite the rumors, Clifford approaches Ricky and asks him to be his bodyguard. He refuses, but the boys become friends after Ricky saves him from a beating by Moody and his gang. He has emotional issues over the death of his brother, and although he's slow to trust Clifford, Ricky shows him a cherished motorcycle that he has been rebuilding. The friendship between them is strengthened as Clifford successfully helps Ricky search junkyards for a hard-to-find cylinder for the motorcycle's engine.

Through Clifford's friendship, Ricky comes out of his shell, proving to a few classmates that he's not the killer the school rumors allege. As Clifford, Ricky, and a few other friends from school eat lunch in Lincoln Park, Moody and his gang approach. Moody has enlisted older bodybuilder Mike to be his bodyguard. He intimidates and physically abuses Ricky, who refuses to fight. Mike vandalizes his motorcycle before Moody pushes it into the lagoon. Ricky runs away, ashamed and angry.

Ricky later appears at Clifford's hotel, asking for money before leaving again. Clifford follows him and they argue before Ricky finally reveals that it was he who accidentally shot his brother while playing with their father's gun, and lied about finding his brother after the fact. As a result, he is overwhelmed with guilt and remorse, leaving Clifford behind as he takes a subway train into the night.

Later, Moody is back at the park to continue bullying Clifford and his friends. Ricky is also there retrieving his motorcycle from the lagoon. Moody notices, demanding the motorcycle, which Ricky silently refuses. Moody summons Mike, who starts to push and intimidate Ricky again. The two then engage in a long fistfight, which Ricky ultimately wins, knocking Mike out.  Moody and Clifford then split off into their own fistfight, after Moody tried to unfairly intervene in the fight between Ricky and Mike. Ricky urges Clifford to fight him while coaching him. Clifford initially fights incompetently, taunted by the overconfident Moody, but finally lands several solid punches, the last of which knocks Moody down, breaking his nose. Moody sits on the ground, bleeding and whining, showing to be a coward. Ricky retrieves his motorcycle, and jokingly asks Clifford to be his bodyguard as they leave with their friends.

Production
The film was shot on location in Chicago with Lake View High School providing the setting for the film's fictional Fleer H.S. The hotel that Clifford lives in and which is managed by his father is the real life Ambassador East (now known as the Ambassador Hotel) at 1301 North State Parkway.

Cast

 Adam Baldwin as Ricky Linderman
 Chris Makepeace as Clifford Peache
 Matt Dillon as Melvin Moody
 Paul Quandt as Carson
 Richard Bradley as Dubrow
 Tim Reyna as Koontz
 Dean R. Miller as Hightower
 Martin Mull as Mr. Larry Peache
 Ruth Gordon as Gramma Peache
 Richard Cusack as Principal Roth
 Joan Cusack as Shelley
 Hank Salas as Mike
 Kathryn Grody as Ms. Jump
 Patrick Billingsley as biology teacher
 John Houseman as Dobbs
 Craig Richard Nelson as Griffith
 Tim Kazurinsky as workman
 George Wendt as air conditioning engineer
 Jennifer Beals (uncredited) as Shelly's friend

Release and reception
My Bodyguard opened on July 11, 1980, in limited release, and wide release on August 15, 1980. In its limited weekend, the film opened at #3 with $178,641 and went on to gross $22,482,953 in the United States.

The film was named as one of the top ten films of 1980 by National Board of Review. It was also nominated by the Writers Guild of America for Best Drama Written Directly for the Screen, and in his analysis of the 53rd Academy Awards, Gary Arnold of The Washington Post wrote that My Bodyguard was unfairly snubbed when it failed to receive an Oscar nomination for Best Original Screenplay.

The film ranked No. 45 on Entertainment Weeklys list of the 50 Best High School Movies.

The film received generally positive reviews; on review aggregator website Rotten Tomatoes, 79% of 34 critics gave the film a positive review (with an average rating of 6.8/10) and the site's critics' consensus reading, "T. Bill debuts as an affectionate director, keenly aware of growing pains."

Home video release
The film was released on DVD on January 29, 2002 and also was released on Blu-ray on September 6, 2016.

References

External links
 
 
 
 
 

1980 films
1980s high school films
1980s teen comedy-drama films
20th Century Fox films
American comedy-drama films
American high school films
American teen comedy-drama films
Films about bullying
Films scored by Dave Grusin
Films set in Chicago
Films shot in Chicago
1980 directorial debut films
American children's comedy films
Films directed by Tony Bill
1980s English-language films
1980s American films